Stephen Joseph "Red" Tramback (October 1, 1915 – December 28, 1979) was an outfielder in Major League Baseball. He played for the New York Giants.

References

External links

1915 births
1979 deaths
Major League Baseball outfielders
New York Giants (NL) players
Baseball players from Pennsylvania